Armin Otto Leuschner (January 16, 1868 – April 22, 1953) was an American astronomer and educator.

Biography 

Leuschner was born on January 16, 1868, in the United States but raised in Germany. He returned to the United States for university studies, graduating from the University of Michigan in 1888 with a degree in mathematics. Leuschne then became the first graduate student at Lick Observatory, but due to conflicts with his advisor, Lick director Edward S. Holden, he left Lick before finishing his Ph.D. Leuschner subsequently returned to Germany and attended the University of Berlin, where in 1897 he earned his doctorate with a highly praised thesis on the orbits of comets.

He returned to California as an associate professor in astronomy at University of California, Berkeley, where he remained for over half a century. He founded an observatory there for student instruction, later renamed in his honor Leuschner Observatory. Together with Lick director James E. Keeler, Leuschner shaped the combined graduate program at Berkeley and Lick into one of the nation's foremost centers of astronomical education. Leuschner's own research continued to focus on the orbits of asteroids and comets; this subject required tremendous amounts of detailed computation, which made the work well-suited to be shared with a long series of students, many of whom went on to successful astronomical careers of their own. More than five dozen students received their doctorates under Leuschner's guidance.

In 1913, Leuschner became dean of the entire Graduate School at Berkeley, and later was appointed head of all World War I related training at the university. He was a founding member of the Astronomical Society of the Pacific, served a term as the president of the American Association of University Professors, and chaired the International Astronomical Union's committee on comets and minor planets for two decades.

Leuschner was one of the first astronomers to dispute Pluto as being Planet X as predicted by Lowell. By 1932 he was already suggesting that Pluto had a mass less than the Earth, and that the discovery of Pluto was an accidental by-product of the Lowell search.

Honors
Awards
 James Craig Watson Medal (1916) 
 Order of the North Star, Sweden (1924)
 Bruce Medal (1936)
 Rittenhouse Medal (1937)
 Halley Lecturer, University of Oxford (1938)
Named after him
 Leuschner (crater) on the Moon
 Leuschner Observatory
 Main-belt asteroid 1361 Leuschneria
 Asteroid 718 Erida is named after his daughter Erida Leuschner.

References

External links 
Denies Planet Really Found (Sarasota Herald April 15, 1930)
Armin Otto Leuschner papers, 1875–1951 at The Bancroft Library
National Academy of Sciences Biographical Memoir
Portrait of Armin Otto Leuschner from the Lick Observatory Records Digital Archive, UC Santa Cruz Library's Digital Collections

1868 births
1953 deaths
American astronomers
University of Michigan College of Literature, Science, and the Arts alumni
Humboldt University of Berlin alumni
University of California, Berkeley faculty
Order of the Polar Star
Presidents of the American Association of University Professors